Penny Barg and Tine Scheuer-Larsen were the defending champions but did not compete that year.

Sandra Cecchini and Mercedes Paz won in the final 6–0, 6–2 against Linda Ferrando and Silvia La Fratta.

Seeds
Champion seeds are indicated in bold text while text in italics indicates the round in which those seeds were eliminated.

 Catarina Lindqvist /  Maria Lindström (quarterfinals)
 Sandra Cecchini /  Mercedes Paz (champions)
n/a
 Neige Dias /  Patricia Medrado (quarterfinals)

Draw

External Links
 1988 Volvo Open Women's Doubles Draw

Women's Doubles
Doubles
1988 in Swedish women's sport